Jack Heywood Aspinwall (5 February 1933 – 19 May 2015) was a British Conservative politician.

Career 
In the February 1974 and October 1974 elections, Aspinwall was the Liberal Party candidate for Kingswood in the rural county of Avon, coming third in both. He changed his allegiance to the Conservatives in 1975 as "the priority was to defeat socialism" and was elected as the Member of Parliament for the seat in 1979, beating the Labour incumbent, Terence Walker, by 303 votes. He served there for one parliament until the 1983 election, when he stood for and was elected for the new constituency of Wansdyke, which he represented for three further parliaments until his retirement at the 1997 general election.

Personal life
Born in Bootle, Aspinwall had two brothers, Frank and Raymond. He won a scholarship to Prescot Grammar School, but his mother died when he was 14 years old and he went into care. He joined the RAF after leaving school. While stationed in Wiltshire in 1954, he met his future wife, Brenda Squires, whom he married in 1954. He and his wife had three children. Jack Aspinwall died of cancer at Willsbridge, near Bristol, England, on 19 May 2015, aged 82.

References

Sources
Times Guide to the House of Commons, Times Newspapers Limited, 1992 edition.

External links
 

1933 births
2015 deaths
Conservative Party (UK) MPs for English constituencies
Liberal Party (UK) parliamentary candidates
UK MPs 1979–1983
UK MPs 1983–1987
UK MPs 1987–1992
UK MPs 1992–1997
People from Bootle
Politics of Bath and North East Somerset
Deaths from cancer in England
Royal Air Force airmen
People educated at Prescot Grammar School